Edith Addams de Habbelinck (1 August 1907 – 16 August 2002) was a Belgian fencer who competed in the individual women's foil event at the 1928 Summer Olympics.

References

External links
 

1907 births
2002 deaths
Belgian female foil fencers
Olympic fencers of Belgium
Fencers at the 1928 Summer Olympics
Sportspeople from Brussels